Henry Stewart Caulfield (December 9, 1873 – May 11, 1966) was an American lawyer and Republican politician from St. Louis, Missouri. He represented Missouri in the U.S. House from 1907 to 1909 and was the 37th Governor of Missouri from 1929 to 1933.

Biography
Caulfield was born in St. Louis, Missouri on December 9, 1873.  He attended the public schools of St. Louis public schools and St. Charles College of Missouri.  In 1895 Caulfield graduated from Washington University School of Law in St. Louis.  He was admitted to the bar later that year and practiced in St. Louis.

Caulfield was an unsuccessful candidate for the United States House of Representatives in 1904.  In 1906 he was the successful Republican nominee for a seat in the House.  He served in the 60th Congress (March 4, 1907 – March 3, 1909), and was not a candidate for renomination in 1908.

After Caulfield left Congress, Governor Herbert S. Hadley appointed him state excise commissioner in St. Louis, and Caulfield served from 1909 to 1910.  From 1910 to 1912 Caulfield served as Judge of the Missouri Court of Appeals for the Eastern District, based in St. Louis.  In 1914 Caulfield served as counsel for the St. Louis City and County Board of Freeholders.  In 1921 and 1922 Caulfield was St. Louis City Counselor.  In 1925 and 1926 he was chairman of the Board of Freeholders.

In 1928 Caulfield ran successfully for Governor of Missouri, and he served from January 14, 1929 to January 9, 1933.  During his term Caulfield founded the Missouri State Highway Patrol, and worked to cope with strains on the state budget caused by the Great Depression.  Near the end of his term in 1933 state legislature, which was controlled by Republicans, attempted to gerrymander Congressional districts in order elect more Republicans.  Caulfield vetoed the bill, which forced Missouri's U.S. House members to run at-large, resulting in Democratic candidates winning every seat.

Caulfield was the keynote speaker at the 1932 Republican National Convention.  In 1937 and 1938 he served on the St. Louis Board of Election Commissioners.  He was the unsuccessful Republican nominee for United States Senator in 1938, losing to incumbent Democrat Bennett Champ Clark.  From 1941 to 1949 he served as director of public welfare in St. Louis.  He then resumed the practice of law, and in 1953 served as a member of the State Reorganization Commission, which proposed reforms to state government.

Death and burial
Caulfield died in St. Louis on May 11, 1966.  He was interred at Oak Grove Cemetery in St. Louis.

Family
His brother William E. Caulfield (1871-1946) was also involved in politics, and served on the St. Louis City Council, in the Missouri House of Representatives, and in the Missouri State Senate.

Caulfield was married twice.  In 1897 he married Adele Lopez, who died in 1898.  In 1902 he married Fannie Alice Delano, and they were the parents of four children.

External links 

Henry S. Caulfield at National Governors Association

1873 births
1966 deaths
Republican Party governors of Missouri
Washington University School of Law alumni
Missouri state court judges
Lawyers from St. Louis
Politicians from St. Louis
Republican Party members of the United States House of Representatives from Missouri